Nath Valley School is a co-educational high school located off Paithan Road in  Aurangabad, Maharashtra, India. It is primarily a day school also has limited boarding facility for boys and girls in their campus.

History

The school was founded in the year 1992 at behest of local industrialist of Aurangabad under leadership of Mr Bhogale & others.

Classes
The school runs classes from Standard 1 to Standard 12, that is from primary till higher secondary.

Affiliation
The school is affiliated to Central Board of Secondary Education since 1994.

Campus
The campus of the school is spread on around 20 acres of land, which has apart from school building, canteen,  playground for football, volleyball, cricket also has separate hostels for boys and girls and residence quarters for teachers.

Awards

The school has been the top ranking school for many years with their students giving best academic results consistently.

The Principal of the school
Dass was awarded National Teacher's Award in 2014.

The school has won for consecutive four years from  2007-2010, 2011-2014, 2014-2017 2018 -2021 International School Award for outstanding development the international dimension in school curriculum  given by the British Council (ISA) The school's students have collaborated with counterparts from schools in the UK, Nigeria, Poland, France, Germany, Australia, China, Singapore and Spain.

References

High schools and secondary schools in Maharashtra
Educational institutions established in 1992
Boarding schools in Maharashtra
Girls' schools in Maharashtra
Education in Aurangabad, Maharashtra
Private schools in Maharashtra
Co-educational schools in India
1992 establishments in Maharashtra